Yanshan County is a county in the east of Hebei province, China, bordering Shandong to the south and east. China National Highway 205 runs northwest-southeast through the county.

Administrative divisions

There are 6 towns and 6 townships under the county's administration.

Towns:
Yanshan, Wangshu, Hanji, Shengfo, Qingyun, Qiantong

Townships:
Bianwu Township, Xiaoying Township, Mengdian Township, Xiaozhuang Township, Yangji Township, Changzhuang Township

Climate

References

External links

County-level divisions of Hebei
Cangzhou